Richeza of Sweden, also Rixa - Swedish: Rikissa - may refer to:

Richeza of Poland, Queen consort of Sweden about 1127 
Richeza of Denmark, Queen consort of Sweden 1210 
Rikissa Birgersdotter, Swedish princess de facto 1238 
Richeza of Sweden, Queen of Poland, Princess of Sweden about 1273 
Richeza, Princess of Sweden, died 1348, daughter of King Magnus III, abbess
Richeza, Princess of Sweden about 1448, daughter of King Carl II, nun